Novokabanovo (Yañı Qaban) is a rural locality (a selo) and the administrative centre of Novokabanovsky Selsoviet, Krasnokamsky District, Bashkortostan, Russia. The population was 926 as of 2010. There are 17 streets.

Geography 
Novokabanovo is located 46 km southwest of Nikolo-Beryozovka (the district's administrative centre) by road. Agidel is the nearest rural locality.

References 

Rural localities in Krasnokamsky District